Edward R. Warby (born 7 March 1968) is a Dutch musician, best known as the drummer for death metal band Gorefest and progressive rock/metal project Ayreon.

He also appeared in the band Agressor in 1982 and joined the Eindhoven-based metal band Elegy in 1987. Warby moved to Gorefest in 1992, where he replaced the former drummer just before the recording sessions of "False", he had to learn all themes and develop his work in just two weeks, which he managed to achieve in a matter so fast that producer Colin Richardson nicknamed him Fast Eddy. After Gorefest split up in 1999, he took part in the re-united Gorefest in 2004.

In 1998, Arjen Anthony Lucassen asked Warby to perform on his album Into the Electric Castle, because Arjen was impressed with Warby's works with Gorefest. From that moment on, Warby had performed on Ayreon's every album, except for Universal Migrator Part 1: The Dream Sequencer and Transitus. He also performed on the re-recording of Actual Fantasy (the original recording featured a computerized set of drums). He's also a member, since its creation in 2002, of Lucassen's band Star One and has also performed in his latest solo album Lost in the New Real.

He helped the Dutch pop band Krezip during the recordings of "Days Like This" in 2002. He also helped German band Love Like Blood with three songs of their album "Snakekiller", in 1998. In 2005 he played live with the Dutch gothic metal band After Forever while their actual drummer André Borgman was recovering from cancer.

In 2008, Warby began a doom metal project named The 11th Hour, and released the album The Burden of Grief in 2009. All guitars, bass, drums, keyboards and clean vocals are performed by Warby, with the additional growls contributed by Rogga Johansson (Ribspreader). The Burden of Grief is a concept album, "about a man about to die from a lung disease."

Discography

With The 11th Hour 
 The Burden of Grief (2009)
 Lacrima Mortis (2012)

With Arjen Anthony Lucassen 
 Lost in the New Real (2012)

With Vuur 
 In This Moment We Are Free – Cities (2017)

With Hail of Bullets 
 …Of Frost and War (2008)
 On Divine Winds (2010)
 III: The Rommel Chronicles (2013)

With Elegy 
 Labyrinth of Dreams (1992)

With Gorefest 
 False (Nuclear Blast 1992)
 The Eindhoven Insanity (Nuclear Blast 1993)
 Erase (Nuclear Blast 1994)
 Fear EP (1994)
 Soul Survivor (Nuclear Blast 1996)
 Freedom EP (1996)
 Chapter 13 (SPV 1998)
 La Muerte (2005)
 Rise to Ruin (2007)

With Ayreon 
 Into the Electric Castle (1998)
 Universal Migrator Part 2: Flight of the Migrator (2000)
 The Human Equation (InsideOut 2004)
 Actual Fantasy (Revisited) (InsideOut 2005)
 01011001 (2008)
 The Theory of Everything (2013)
 The Source (2017)

With The Gentle Storm 
 The Diary (2015)

With Lana Lane 
 Secrets of Astrology (2000)

With Star One 
 Space Metal (InsideOut 2002)
 Live on Earth (InsideOut 2003)
 Victims of the Modern Age (InsideOut 2010)
 Revel in Time (InsideOut 2022)

Guest appearances

With Love Like Blood 
 Snakekiller (on 3 songs) (1998)

With Krezip 
 Days Like This (2002)

References

External links 

 
 
 

1968 births
Living people
Musicians from Rotterdam
Dutch rock drummers
Male drummers
Dutch heavy metal drummers
Star One (band) members
Gorefest members